Bakhargul Kerimova is a writer from Turkmenistan. She has written both poetry and fiction during her career. A book of her short stories was published in Ashgabat in 1983, and a volume of her poetry was issued in 1988. She has remained active in public life in Turkmenistan since the breakup of the Soviet Union.

References

Living people
Turkmenistan women poets
Turkmenistan poets
Turkmenistan short story writers
Soviet women poets
Women short story writers
20th-century poets
20th-century short story writers
20th-century women writers
21st-century poets
21st-century short story writers
21st-century women writers
20th-century Turkmenistan writers
21st-century Turkmenistan writers
20th-century Turkmenistan women
21st-century Turkmenistan women
Year of birth missing (living people)